Tom Schiller is an American writer best known for his eleven-year stint writing and directing short films for Saturday Night Live (following the show's original short film makers Albert Brooks and Gary Weis).  His films, often featuring members of the original SNL cast, aired on the program in a segment titled, "Schiller's Reel."  
He is the son of TV comedy writer/producer Bob Schiller.

Career
Schiller was part of the original 1975 writing team when Saturday Night Live debuted on NBC.  Schiller was an on-screen cast member for one season. Notable films included the Federico Fellini send-up "La Dolce Gilda" and "Don't Look Back in Anger", which depicted an elderly John Belushi as the last living "Not Ready For Primetime Player" and dancing on the graves of his deceased castmembers.  (Ironically, Belushi would be the first SNL cast member to die, four years after the film first aired.) Another favorite was "Java Junkie", a send-up of a 1950s-style cautionary film about a coffee addict (played by Peter Aykroyd) which Schiller made with producer/cinematographer Neal Marshad. Schiller wrote and directed the short film "Love Is a Dream" for SNL again with producer/cinematographer Neal Marshad and starring Phil Hartman and Jan Hooks. Schiller also wrote and directed a feature film, Nothing Lasts Forever (1984). The film, which was shelved by Metro-Goldwyn-Mayer, has never been officially released theatrically or for home media, featured Bill Murray, Dan Aykroyd, Zach Galligan, Sam Jaffe, Mort Sahl, Lauren Tom, Imogene Coca, Apollonia van Ravenstein and Eddie Fisher, has gained a cult following and influenced a number of young directors.

Prior to working on Saturday Night Live, Schiller worked as an assistant to documentary filmmaker Robert Snyder and directed a film about his longtime friend and mentor, author Henry Miller. Schiller is the son of sitcom writer Bob Schiller, who was a staff writer on I Love Lucy.

Schiller has gone on to direct over 500 comedy TV commercials and is currently represented by his own company, Schillervision.

In spring, 2013, the comedy album "Tom and Don", which is a compilation of improv interviews between Schiller and musician Donald Fagen, was released. Schiller's body of work is the subject of the 2005 book Nothing Lost Forever: The Films of Tom Schiller by Michael Streeter. Schiller is married to humorist, community volunteer, author and  partygiver, Jacque Schiller, née Lynn.

References

External links
 
 Nothing Lost Forever:The Films of Tom Schiller - a book about Schiller.
 http://www.schillervision.com/ the official Schillervision site
^  Interview - Tom and Don: Part 1 at Apple ITunes

Year of birth missing (living people)
Living people
American male comedians
21st-century American comedians
American male television actors
American television directors
American television writers
American male television writers
American film directors
Primetime Emmy Award winners
21st-century American screenwriters
Advertising directors
21st-century American male writers